Loch Awe railway station is a railway station serving the village of Lochawe, on the northern bank of Loch Awe, in western Scotland. This station is on the Oban branch of the West Highland Line, originally part of the Callander and Oban Railway. It is sited  from Callander via Glen Ogle, between Dalmally and Falls of Cruachan. ScotRail manage the station and operate all services.

History 

The station originally had one platform on a passing loop with sidings on both sides of the line, but a second platform, on the north side of the loop, was brought into use on 5 May 1902. On 8 August 1897, the station building was destroyed by fire.

A camping coach was also positioned here by the Scottish Region from 1952 to 1958, and two coaches were here in 1959 and 1960.

The station closed on 1 November 1965 but reopened on 10 May 1985 using only the more recent platform. The original platform remains in situ, but disused.

The privately owned locomotive that worked the Ben Cruachan Quarry Branch had authority to run over the main Callander and Oban Line between Loch Awe station and the branch junction, just over half a mile to the east.

Tea Train 

An old Mark 1 carriage (which was formerly painted in green and cream "West Highland Line" livery and carried the number SC4494) sits on an isolated length of track immediately to the west of the station, on the south side. Having been brought to Loch Awe by a ballast train on 29 May 1988, it was until 2008 used as a tea room. The main single line had to be temporarily severed and slewed so that the carriage could be shunted onto its own track without the use of a crane.

Facilities 
The station only comprises a shelter, a help point, a bench and a small car park. There is step-free access form the car park. As there are no facilities to purchase tickets, passengers must buy one in advance, or from the guard on the train.

Passenger volume 

The statistics cover twelve month periods that start in April.

Services

On Sundays, there are 3 departures each way throughout the year, plus a fourth in the summer months only which operates to Edinburgh Waverley from late June–August.

References

Bibliography

External links

Video footage of Loch Awe Railway Station

Railway stations in Argyll and Bute
Railway stations served by ScotRail
Railway stations in Great Britain opened in 1880
Railway stations in Great Britain closed in 1965
Railway stations in Great Britain opened in 1985
Reopened railway stations in Great Britain
Beeching closures in Scotland
Former Caledonian Railway stations